Wives with Knives is an American documentary television series broadcast on Investigation Discovery. The series debuted on November 23, 2012.

Series overview

Episodes

Season 1 (2012)

Season 2 (2013–14)

Season 3 (2014–15)

Season 4 (2015–16)

Season 5 (2016–17)

References 

Wives with Knives